Eyal Almoshnino (born April 10, 1976) is an Israeli footballer of a Tunisian-Jewish descent who played for Ironi Ashdod, F.C. Ashdod, Maccabi Haifa, Hapoel Bnei Lod, Maccabi Be'er Sheva and Maccabi Kiryat Malakhi. He was capped at under-21 level, and played once for the senior national team.

Honours
Israeli Second Division:
Runner-up (1): 1996-97
Israeli Championships
Winner (1): 2001–02
Toto Cup:
Runner-up (2): 2004–05, 2005–06

References

1976 births
Living people
Israel under-21 international footballers
Israel international footballers
Israeli footballers
Maccabi Ironi Ashdod F.C. players
F.C. Ashdod players
Maccabi Haifa F.C. players
Hapoel Bnei Lod F.C. players
Maccabi Be'er Sheva F.C. players
Maccabi Kiryat Malakhi F.C. players
Liga Leumit players
Israeli Premier League players
Footballers from Ashdod
Israeli people of Tunisian-Jewish descent
Association football defenders